Lithacodia flavofimbria is a species of moth in the family Erebidae first described by Max Saalmüller in 1881. It is found in Madagascar.

References 

Eustrotiinae
Moths of Madagascar
Moths of Africa
Moths described in 1881